Jacques Thelemaque is an American screenwriter and director best known as the president of the Los Angeles film collective Filmmakers Alliance.

Biography
Thelemaque studied briefly at the USC School of Cinematic Arts, but his film career began in 1993 when he co-founded Filmmakers Alliance with his then-wife, Diane Gaidry. He built the grassroots film collective from a loose-knit group of 
filmmakers into an important independent filmmaking resource organization with films screening at every major festival in the world and receiving global distribution. He has overseen the production of hundreds of  films and developed a wide range of innovative and impactful filmmaking support programs.

In 2004, he and producing partner Liam Finn formed FA Productions, of which they are Co-Presidents. Jacques himself - and through FA Productions - has produced several feature films including "Shock Television", "The Dogwalker", "Within", "Midnight Movie" and "The Revenant". He is also a co-producer on Brooklyn Reptyle’s "Audie & the Wolf".

In 2005, he was named Chief Community Officer of the festival submission/filmmaker support site, Withoutabox.com. He left that company prior to them being acquired by the Internet Movie Database.

As a writer-director his work includes the feature film "The Dogwalker" (Los Angeles Film Festival, Hong Kong International Film Festival, Best First Feature - Cinequest Film Festival), as well as the shorts "Transaction" (Sundance Film Festival, winner of the Grand Prix du Jury Award in the Labo Competition at the Clermont-Ferrand Short Film Festival), "Infidelity (in equal parts)" (Sundance Film Festival, Los Angeles Film Festival), "Egg' (Mill Valley Film Festival, Best Comedy Short - Cinequest Film Festival, Jury Award for Best Short – Methodfest) and "Love Without Socks" (AFI FEST - American Film Institute).

He regularly participates in filmmaking panels, seminars, workshops and classes. He was on the board of directors for The Los Angeles Independent Film Festival (now Film Independent's Los Angeles Film Festival) and currently sits on the advisory board of the IFP Emerging Filmmaker Labs as well as the boards of the Downtown Film Festival and the Ashland Independent Film Festival.

See External Links below for words in RED.

References

External links

A Filmmaker's Life - Official Blog of Jacques Thelemaque
Filmmakers Alliance Official Site
Official Website of Diane Gaidry
FA Productions
Liam Finn Bio
Official Website of The Dogwalker
Clermont-Ferrand Short Film Festival
Ashland Independent Film Festival
Downtown Film Festival
MethodFest
Official Website of Within
Official Website of Midnight Movie
Withoutabox
Brooklyn Reptyle Productions

American male screenwriters
Living people
American film directors
Year of birth missing (living people)